Caffeine is a social broadcasting platform (live streaming) that delivers live, interactive content at the intersection of gaming, sports, and entertainment. Caffeine has raised $146 million to date from investors in 3 rounds led by 21st Century Fox, Andreessen Horowitz, and Greylock Partners. Caffeine secured a $100 million investment in September 2018 from 21st Century Fox with chairman Lachlan Murdoch joining Caffeine's board, as well as the creation of a newly formed joint venture called Caffeine Studios. The studio produces exclusive gaming, esports, sports, and live entertainment content that is streamed to Caffeine's audience.

Both Caffeine and Twitch partnered with celebrities to host pre-game celebrations for Super Bowl 2020. Caffeines celebrities included JuJu Smith-Schuster and Offset.

References

The Walt Disney Company
Video game streaming services
Internet properties established in 2018